Iliya Voynov (born 21 March 1964) is a former Bulgarian footballer who played as a winger. He earned 8 caps for the Bulgarian national team.

Honours

Club
CSKA Sofia
 Bulgarian Cup: 1984–‘1985; 1996-1997
 Cup of the Soviet Army: 1984–85
 A Group: 1996–97

References

External links

1964 births
Living people
Bulgarian footballers
Bulgaria international footballers
FC Botev Vratsa players
PFC CSKA Sofia players
Portimonense S.C. players
G.D. Estoril Praia players
C.F. Estrela da Amadora players
PFC Spartak Pleven players
First Professional Football League (Bulgaria) players
Primeira Liga players
Liga Portugal 2 players
Bulgarian expatriate sportspeople in Portugal
Expatriate footballers in Portugal
People from Vratsa

Association football midfielders